Asian Games is a collaborative album by Yōsuke Yamashita, Bill Laswell and Ryuichi Sakamoto. It was released on May 26, 1993, by Verve Forecast Records.

Track listing

Personnel
Adapted from the Asian Games liner notes.

Musicians
Aïyb Dieng – congas, cymbals, tambourine, percussion
Bill Laswell – bass guitar, sitar, effects, producer (1, 3, 4, 6)
Ryuichi Sakamoto – keyboards, producer and recording (2, 5)
Nicky Skopelitis Fairlight synthesizer, effects
Yōsuke Yamashita – piano, keyboards

Technical
Oz Fritz – recording (1, 3, 4, 6)
Katsuhiko Hibino – illustrations
Dimitri Jakimowicz – recording (1, 3, 4, 6)
Robert Musso – mixing, recording (1, 3, 4, 6)
Hiroaki Sugawara – recording (2, 5)
Howie Weinberg – mastering

Release history

References

External links
 

1993 live albums
Collaborative albums
Albums produced by Bill Laswell
Albums produced by Ryuichi Sakamoto
Bill Laswell live albums
Ryuichi Sakamoto albums
Yōsuke Yamashita albums
Verve Forecast Records live albums
Experimental pop albums